The Kupa Piti Kungka Tjuta is a council of Senior Aboriginal Women from Coober Pedy, South Australia. They protest against Government plans to dump radioactive waste in their land, and for the protection of their land and culture.

The council was formed in 1995 by Eileen Kampakuta Brown, Eileen Wani Wingfield and other Aboriginal elders. The elders come from the Arabana, Kokatha, Yankunytjatjara and Antikarinya peoples. 'Kupa Piti' is the Indigenous name for Coober Pedy; 'kunga tjuta' means 'many woman' in the Western Desert language.

Brown and Wingfield were awarded the Goldman Environmental Prize in 2003 for their efforts.

In August 2004 the Australian government abandoned its plans for the nuclear waste dump, after a court decision.

References

External links
Nuclear waste and indigenous rights

1995 in the environment
Environmental organisations based in Australia
Environmental protests in Australia
Organisations serving Indigenous Australians
Anti-nuclear organizations
1995 establishments in Australia